Dysoxylum alliaceum is a tree in the family Meliaceae. The specific epithet  is from the Latin meaning "onion-like", referring to the smell of the inner bark.

Description
The sweetly scented flowers are white or pinkish.

Distribution and habitat
Dysoxylum alliaceum is native to the Andaman Islands, Thailand and throughout Malesia to the Solomon Islands and Queensland. Its habitat is rain forests from sea-level to  altitude.

References

alliaceum
Flora of the Andaman Islands
Trees of Thailand
Trees of Malesia
Trees of the Solomon Islands
Trees of Australia
Flora of Queensland
Plants described in 1824